The 444th Air Expeditionary Advisory Squadron is a provisional United States Air Force unit.  It was last assigned to the 838th Air Expeditionary Advisory Group at Shindand Air Base, Afghanistan, where it trained Afghan Air Force pilots with light aircraft and helicopters.

The squadron was activated during World War II.  It participated in combat in the Mediterranean and European Theater of Operations, earning a Distinguished Unit Citation and a French Croix de Guerre with Palm.  It remained in Europe after V-E Day, returning to the United States for inactivation in December 1945.

The squadron was briefly active in the reserves from 1947 to 1949, but does not appear to have been fully manned or equipped with operational aircraft.  It was activated again in 1959, when Strategic Air Command expanded its Boeing B-47 Stratojet wings from three to four operational squadrons. However,  the B-47 was being withdrawn from service and the squadron was inactivated along with its parent wing the following year.

History

World War II

Established in mid-1942 as a Martin B-26 Marauder medium bomber group.  Trained under Third Air Force in Florida, deployed to England under the VIII Air Support Command, 3d Bombardment Wing.

Operated against targets on the continent during early fall of 1942; deployed to North Africa as part of Twelfth Air Force after Operation Torch landings in Algeria in November.   Flew tactical bombing missions against Axis forces in North Africa until the end of the Tunisian Campaign in May 1943.  Participated in the Sicilian and Italian Campaigns; liberation of Corsica and Sardinia and the Invasion of Southern France.   Supported Allied ground forces in the Western Allied Invasion of Germany, spring 1945 and becoming part of the United States Air Forces in Europe Army of Occupation in Germany, fall 1945.    Personnel demobilized in Germany and the squadron inactivated as a paper unit in December 1945.

Reserves
Reactivated in the reserves in 1947.  Never manned or equipped.

Strategic Air Command

From 1958, the Boeing B-47 Stratojet wings of Strategic Air Command (SAC) began to assume an alert posture at their home bases, reducing the amount of time spent on alert at overseas bases.  The SAC alert cycle divided itself into four parts: planning, flying, alert and rest to meet General Thomas S. Power’s initial goal of maintaining one third of SAC’s planes on fifteen minute ground alert, fully fueled and ready for combat to reduce vulnerability to a Soviet missile strike.  To implement this new system B-47 wings reorganized from three to four squadrons.  The 444th was activated at March Air Force Base as the fourth squadron of the 320th Bombardment Wing.  In September, the phaseout of the B-47 be accelerated resulted in the squadron and 320th Wing being inactivated on 15 September 1960, with the aircraft were sent to AMARC storage at Davis-Monthan.

Expeditionary operations
The squadron was converted to provisional status and redesignated 444th Air Expeditionary Advisory Squadron. It provided training in helicopters and light Cessna 182 aircraft to the Afghan Air Force.  This included training with the use of night vision goggle while flying the MH-6 Little Bird at Shindand Air Base.

Lineage
 Constituted as the 444th Bombardment Squadron (Medium) on 19 June 1942
 Activated on 1 July 1942
 Redesignated 444th Bombardment Squadron, Medium on 9 October 1944
 Inactivated on 8 December 1945
 Redesignated 444th Bombardment Squadron, Light on 26 May 1947
 Activated in the reserve on 9 July 1947
 Inactivated on 27 June 1949
 Redesignated 444th Bombardment Squadron, Medium on 6 October 1958
 Activated on 1 January 1959
 Discontinued on 15 September 1960
 Converted to provisional status and redesignated 444th Air Expeditionary Squadron on 13 May 2011
 Redesignated 444th Air Expeditionary Advisory Squadron on 13 May 2011
 Activated by March 2012
 Inactivated unknown date

Assignments
 320th Bombardment Group, 1 July 1942 – 4 December 1945
 320th Bombardment Group, 9 July 1947 – 27 June 1949
 320th Bombardment Wing, 1 January 1959 – 15 September 1960
 Air Combat Command to activate or inactivate as needed
 838th Air Expeditionary Advisory Group

Stations

 MacDill Field, Florida, 1 July 1942
 Drane Field, Florida, 8–28 August 1942
 RAF Hethel (AAF-114), England, 12 September 1942
 RAF Tibenham (AAF-124), England, 1 October 1942
 Oran Es Sénia Airport, Algeria, 9 January 1943
 Tafaraoui Airfield, Algeria, 28 January 1943
 Montesquieu Airfield, Algeria, 14 April 1943
 Massicault Airfield, Tunisia, 29 June 1943
 El Bathan Airfield, Tunisia, 28 July 1943

 Decimomannu Airfield, Sardinia, Italy, 9 November 1943
 Alto Airfield, Corsica, France, 20 September 1944
 Dijon-Longvic Airfield (Y-9), France, 11 November 1944
 Dôle-Tavaux Airfield (Y-7), France, 2 April 1945
 Berghof, Germany, 19 June 1945
 AAF Station Herzogenaurach (R-29), 3 September 1945
 Clastres Airfield, France (A-71), c. October-27 November 1945
 Camp Shanks, New York, 4–6 December 1945
 Mitchel Field, New York, 9 July 1947 – 27 June 1949
 March Air Force Base, California, 1 January 1959 – 15 September 1960
 Shindand Air Base, Afghanistan

Aircraft
 Martin B-26 Marauder, 1942–1945
 Boeing B-47 Stratojet, 1959–1960
 None while in provisional status, the unit operated Afghan Air Force aircraft

References

 Notes

 Citations

Bibliography

 
 
 
 
 
 
 

Air expeditionary squadrons of the United States Air Force